Madhabi Puri Buch is the chairperson of the securities regulatory body Securities and Exchange Board of India (SEBI). She is the first woman chairperson to lead SEBI,and Non IAS.

Since April 2017, she has been functioning closely as a whole time member of SEBI with the former chairman Ajay Tyagi. She is also the first person from the private sector to be appointed to this position. In her role as the SEBI chairperson Buch has been credited with bringing rapid changes conducive to the system and corporatization of the organization to improve efficiency.

Education
Buch was educated at Fort Convent School, Mumbai, and at Convent of Jesus and Mary, Delhi. She then graduated with a specialization in Mathematics from the St. Stephen's College, Delhi, and later went on to obtain an MBA at IIM Ahmedabad.

Career

Corporate career 
Her career started in 1989 with ICICI bank. Between 1993 and 1995, Buch worked as lecturer at West Cheshire College in England. She worked in various profiles across companies for 12 years including sales and marketing and product development. She also led operations function. In 2006 she joined ICICI securities and later went on to become the Managing Director and CEO from February 2009 to May 2011. After this Buch moved to Singapore to join Greater Pacific Capital in 2011. Between 2011 and 2017 she worked in various capacities as executive director of many companies like Zansar Technologies, Innoven Capital, and Max Healthcare. Buch also served as an independent director of the Indian School of Development Management (ISDM) and as consultant for New Development Bank (BRICS bank).

Career at SEBI 
In April 2017, Buch was appointed as a whole time director at SEBI and given charge of portfolios like collective investment schemes, surveillance and investment management. After her tenure ended she was appointed to a seven-member technology committee formed to help Sebi design in-house technological systems. Known for her technology and data agnostic attitude, Buch has passed few landmark regulatory orders. In 2018, she passed an order against Sahara Group to return 14000 crores raised from investors through fully convertible debentures in violation of SEBI order asking them to furnish the details of repayment to investors in compliance of its previous orders. In January 2021, Buch conducted a detailed investigation into insider trading by CNBC Awaaz journalist and barred him, his mother and wife from accessing the stock markets. In May 2021, she passed an order against Savla and Ajitkumar for sharing unpublished price sensitive information of Deep Industries stock on the basis of their connection and interaction on social media platform. In August 2021, she identified 15 entities trading in unfair practices in the Zee Entertainment Enterprises stock post its results announcements.

On 1 March 2022, Buch was appointed as the SEBI chairperson for a period of 3 years. Joining SEBI at a challenging time, Buch was questioned by the parliamentary committee in reference to the NSE scam. Being a person from the private sector Buch has undertaken an overhaul of the organization to improve productivity and enhance accountability and fairness at SEBI. In her first 100 days as the chairperson, she has brought about rapid changes in the organization, processes and regulation of the markets. Buch introduced the corporate system of KRAs to drive focussed action on areas that need attention the most with a special emphasis on cyber security and use of tech and data. She has driven the process of seeking extensive market feedback on any key policy changes. Observers say that Buch has put onus on intermediaries to make changes to their systems to evolve with market dynamics. On the other hand she has been pushing custodians and clearing corporations to gear up for the T+1 clearance process. As of now clearance in India is on T+2 basis. Buch has also been seeking additional powers from the government to monitor social media channels to crack down on front running in the markets.

Personal life 
Buch was born as Madhabi Puri to Kamal Puri and his wife. Her father worked for the corporate sector while her mother was an academic with doctorate in political science. At the age of eighteen she got engaged to Dhawal Buch who was a director at FMCG multinational, Unilever. They got married when she was turned 21 and subsequently gave birth to her son, Abhay. Buch says she owes much of her success to her son and her husband who has been her friend, philosopher and guide.

Buch was one of the survivors of the 26/11 Mumbai terrorist attacks. She was with her husband at the Taj Mahal Palace Hotel who was attending a Unilever meeting at that time.

References 

Indian women
Indian businesspeople
1966 births
Living people